Patriotic Self-Defense (Samoobrona Patriotyczna) or Self-Defense Social Movement (Samoobrona Ruch Społeczny) is a minor political party in Poland. Formed in 2006 by Sławomir Izdebski primarily from dissatisfied and/or expelled members of Self-Defense of the Republic of Poland (Samoobrona Rzeczypospolitej Polskiej).

The party's activists include: Henryk Dzido, Zbigniew Witaszek, Marian Curyło, Stanisław Głębocki, Jerzy Michalski and Tadeusz Wojtkowiak.

Patriotic SD has about a 1,000 members. In the Polish parliamentary elections of 2007 it received 2531 (0,02%) votes, thereby failing to secure representation in the Sejm (Polish parliament).

2006 establishments in Poland
Conservative parties in Poland
Political parties established in 2006
Political parties in Poland
Catholic political parties